Richard Thomas Campbell (8 December 1884 – 15 February 1949) was an Australian rules footballer who played with St Kilda in the Victorian Football League (VFL).

Notes

External links 

1884 births
1949 deaths
VFL/AFL players born outside Australia
Australian rules footballers from Victoria (Australia)
St Kilda Football Club players